Oxicesta geographica is a moth of the family Noctuidae. It is found in southern Romania, Austria, Hungary, from the former Yugoslavia to northern Greece and Turkey. It has also been reported from Russian Moldavia and Georgia.

The wingspan is 24–27 mm.

The larvae feed on Euphorbia species, with a preference for species in the subgenus Esula. They feed in silken webs on the apices of their host plant, causing extensive damage. First instars larvae feed on flower buds and tender leaves in groups of 20-30. Fifth and final instar larvae are solitary feeders and consume less than the other instars. Pupation takes place in a light yellow silk cocoon spun on the stem of the host plant.

Gallery

References

External links

Funet Taxonomy
Lepiforum.de

Moths described in 1787
Hadeninae
Moths of Europe
Taxa named by Johan Christian Fabricius